Semidelitschia is a genus of coprophilous fungi in the family Delitschiaceae that contains three species. Semidelitschia was circumscribed in 1969 by mycologists Roy Cain and Robena Luck-Allen to contain the type species, S. agasmatica, found in North America. S. tetraspora (found in Pakistan) and S. nanostellata (from Australia) were added to the genus in 1979 and 2001, respectively. The genus is characterized by species with one-celled, dark ascospores, which distinguishes it from the related genus Delitschia, which have two-celled ascospores.

References

Dothideomycetes genera
Pleosporales